"You'll Be Mine (Party Time)" is a 1996 song by Cuban American singer and songwriter Gloria Estefan. It was released as the follow-up to "Reach", as the second single from her seventh studio album, Destiny (1996). The song is a dance track with strong African rhythms and became one of Estefan's most popular songs. Since its appearance, the song has been present on all the tours of Gloria Estefan as it remains a favorite among fans. In the UK the Classic Paradise radio mix by Love To Infinity was the preferred version played by radio stations including Radio 1. The single peaked within the top 20 in Finland, France, Scotland, Spain and the United Kingdom. In France it was released twice; at its first release, it peaked at number 15, but at the second release the song peaked at number 17.

Estefan and Stevie Wonder collaborated for a special performance of this song at the Super Bowl XXXIII Halftime Show in 1999, the performance received a strong ovation and gave the two singers a boost on sales in the albums the two singers were promoting at that time.

The song has been used twice in the British TV show Strictly Come Dancing for the Salsa, once in a Series 7 dance by Natalie Cassidy and again in 2012 by Fern Britton.

Critical reception
AllMusic editor Jon O'Brien wrote that "the Caribbean-flavored "You'll Be Mine", later sampled in Will Smith's "Miami", is an effortlessly uplifting party track." Larry Flick from Billboard described the song as a "lively, latin-spiked ditty" and a "jiggly revisitation of La Glo's "Conga" era". He added that "this cut is actually better described as a savvy progression of the sound she and the Miami Sound Machine mined", complimenting Estefan who "has rarely sounded more playful, as evident in the gingerly way she surfs atop the track's rushing waves of percussion and horns." Later on the album release, the magazine also noted it a "festive street-party anthem" The Daily Vault's Mark Millan called it "one of Gloria's best dance numbers", with "latin beats and sexy horns". He also noted that it "add much needed light into what is a very mood-driven and introspective collection of songs." 

Damien Mendis from Music Week'''s RM Dance Update rated the song five out of five, stating that the "LTI's Classic Paradise mix is a faultless typically expert, jumpily striding affair that screams HIT ALERT." A reviewer from People Magazine felt that "her sensual vocal style works best when it rides a firecracker groove." The reviewer added that "when she gets wild and frisky in the calypso swing of "You'll Be Mine (Party Time)" then Estefan "can even get a grandma leaping from her rocking chair and dancing into the streets." Bob Waliszewski of Plugged In stated that it "rejoices in life and love". Fernando Gonzales from Star-News'' noted it as a "good-time romp".

Charts

References

1996 singles
Gloria Estefan songs
1996 songs
Epic Records singles
Songs written by Emilio Estefan
Songs written by Lawrence Dermer